Immanuel Stark (born 10 October 1994) is a German cyclist, who currently rides for UCI Continental team .

Major results

2016
 3rd Rund um den Sachsenring
2018
 1st  National Hill Climb Championships
 1st Overall Tour of Vysočina
1st Stage 1
 6th Raiffeisen Grand Prix
2021
 1st  Overall Tour of Bulgaria
1st Mountains classification
1st Stage 2
 1st  Overall In the footsteps of the Romans
1st Stage 1
 1st Mountains classification, Oberösterreichrundfahrt
 2nd Overall CCC Tour - Grody Piastowskie

References

External links

1994 births
Living people
German male cyclists
People from Stollberg
Cyclists from Saxony